In Islam, the Pond of Abundance refers to a pond or river that exists in Paradise. The traditional Muslim belief is that on the Day of Judgement, when people will be resurrected, they will rise in great thirst and be eager to quench it in an atmosphere of chaos. Then, Muhammad would be the one privileged by God to respond to the pleas of believers to quench their thirst by offering them a cool and refreshing drink from the pond.

Origin of the concept
The Quran refers to the situation in Surah Al-Kawthar, but several exegetes maintain that the reference in the Surah is to the general abundance granted to Muhammad. In any case, the concept has come to be identified with the special reverence for Muhammad in comparison to other Prophets and Messengers of God.

In the last day, that great day of the feast, Jesus stood and cried, saying, 'If any man thirst, let him come unto me, and drink. He that believeth on me, as the scripture hath said, out of his belly shall flow rivers of living water'.

Implications
The pond's general implication is that it motivates Muslims to be conscious of the Day of Judgement and its severity and accordingly to plan to improve their afterlife. It also motivates them towards love of Muhammad and promoting the view that the events around the Day of Judgement require belief in the unseen and are highly metaphysical in nature.

See also
Islamic view of the Last Judgment (Akhirah)
Islamic eschatology (Qiyamah)

References

Judgment in Islam
Islamic terminology
Jannah
Ponds